Great Chilton is a village in County Durham, in England. It is situated to the east of Bishop Auckland, near Chilton.

References

External links

Villages in County Durham
Chilton, County Durham